8P can refer to:

Barbados, International Telecommunication Union (ITU) prefix 8P
Pacific Coastal Airlines, IATA airline designator
Trade Air, IATA airline designator
8p, an arm of Chromosome 8 (human)

See also
P8 (disambiguation)

fr:8P
ja:8P